Harold Day may refer to:
Harold Day (Australian footballer) (1890–1961), Australian rules footballer
Harold Day (Royal Navy officer) (1897–1918), Welsh-born World War I flying ace
Harold Day (sportsman) (1898–1972), English rugby union footballer and cricketer

See also
Harry Day (disambiguation)
Day (surname)